Bethlehem is the fourth studio album by American singer Brian McKnight, his first with Motown Records, released on October 20, 1998. The album is his first Christmas album. Bethlehem consists of eleven tracks, featuring original songs and cover versions of Christmas standards and carols, several of which are duets featuring recording artists such as Boyz II Men, Michael Sembello, Tim Miner, and Maria Cole as well McKnight's brother Claude and his sons.

Critical reception

Gina Boldman from AllMusic called Bethlehem a "joyful, romantic holiday album [...] Overall, Bethlehem is a diverse collection of traditional and modern-day Christmas songs with something for everyone celebrating the season."

Track listing

Personnel
Credits adapted from the liner notes of  Bethlehem.

 Bob Becker – viola 
 Boyz II Men – vocals 
 Jackie Brand – violin 
 Denyne Buffum – viola 
 Bruce Carbone – executive producer, producer 
 Susan Chatman – violin 
 Ron Clark – violin 
 Maria Cole – vocals 
 Larry Corbett – cello 
 Derrick Cummings – guitar 
 Mario DeLeon – violin 
 Joel Derouin – violin 
 Bruce Dukov – first violin 
 Prescott Ellison – drums 
 Charlie Everett – violin 
 Stefanie Fife – cello 
 Matt Funes – viola 
 Berj Garabedian – violin 
 Robert Gerry – violin 
 Chris Hanulik – upright bass 
 Peter Hatch – viola 
 Daniel Higgins – alto flute , clarinet 
 Suzie Katayama – cello 
 Dan Kelley – french horn 
 Peter Kent – violin 
 Valerie King – alto flute 
 Dave Koz – saxophone 
 Brian Leonard – violin 
 Robert Lewis – organ 
 Dane Little – cello 
 Mike Markman – violin 
 Brian McKnight – lead vocals and producer , backing vocals , instruments 
 Brian McKnight Jr. – vocals 
 Claude McKnight – vocals 
 Julie McKnight – vocals 
 Niko McKnight – vocals 
 The McKnight Family Choir – vocals 
 Bill Meyers – co-producer 
 Tim Miner – vocals 
 Vicky Miskolosky – viola 
 Wanya Morris – producer 
 The McKnight Family Choir – vocals
 Maria Newman – viola 
 Tollak Ollestad – harmonica 
 Dave "Hard Drive" Pensado – mixing
 Bob Peterson – violin 
 Michele Richards – violin 
 Steve Richards – cello 
 Gerry Rotella – alto flute , flute 
 Eddy Schreyer – mastering
 Michael Sembello – vocals and keyboards 
 Haim Shtrum – violin 
 Dan Smith – cello 
 Tina Soule – cello 
 Eddie Stein – violin 
 Rudy Stein – cello 
 David Stenske – violin 
 Rick Todd – french horn 
 Herb Trawick – executive producer
 John Wittenberg – violin 
 Phil Yao – french horn

Charts

References

Brian McKnight albums
Motown albums
Albums produced by Brian McKnight
1998 Christmas albums
Christmas albums by American artists
Contemporary R&B Christmas albums